St Joseph's High School, Anekal is a private Catholic primary and secondary school and private pre-university college located in Anekal town, a suburb of South Bangalore, in the state of Karnataka, India. The school was founded by the Society of Jesus in 1992. 

The school has 20 classrooms and 27 teachers, a computer room with 17 computers, and uses Continuous and Comprehensive Evaluation (CCE) in grades 1 though 9 and has subsequently expanded to a senior secondary school and pre-university college.

See also
 List of Jesuit sites

References

Jesuit secondary schools in India
Jesuit primary schools in India
Christian schools in Karnataka
Primary schools in Karnataka
High schools and secondary schools in Karnataka
Schools in Bangalore Urban district
Educational institutions established in 1992
1992 establishments in Karnataka
Pre University colleges in Karnataka